Križni Vrh is a settlement in the Municipality of Slovenska Bistrica in northeastern Slovenia. It lies on the main road south of Slovenska Bistrica towards Poljčane. The railway line from Ljubljana to Maribor runs along the western outskirts of the settlement. The area is part of the traditional region of Styria. It is now included with the rest of the municipality in the Drava Statistical Region.

References

External links
 
Križni Vrh at Geopedia

Populated places in the Municipality of Slovenska Bistrica